The 41st Annual GMA Dove Awards presentation was held on April 21, 2010 recognizing accomplishments of musicians for the year 2009. The show was held at The Opry Entertainment Complex in Nashville, Tennessee, and was hosted by Bart Millard.

Nominations were announced on February 18, 2010 during a press conference at Belmont University's Curb Café in Nashville, Tennessee. The announcement was hosted by a group of artists which included Francesca Battistelli, Jeremy Camp, Jason Crabb, Brandon Heath, Kari Jobe, Michael W. Smith, Ben Tankard and Lisa Kimmey.

Casting Crowns won Artist of the Year, while Sidewalk Prophets won New Artist of the Year. Rock group Needtobreathe ended up winning the three awards it was nominated for. Other multiple winners include: Jennie Lee Riddle, Francesca Battistelli, and Jars of Clay.

Performers

Opening ceremony
Voices of Glory
Karen Peck & New River
Rhonda Vincent & The Rage
Collin Raye
The Nelons with Karen Peck

Telecast ceremony
The following performed:

Presenters

Telecast ceremony
The following presented:

Tenley Molzhan – introduced Ricky Skaggs and Gordon Kennedy
Bart Millard – Male Vocalist of the Year
Franklin Graham – introduced the performance from "Come Together Now"
David Mann

Awards

General
Artist of the Year
Francesca Battistelli
Casting Crowns
Jason Crabb
Jars of Clay
Mary Mary
Skillet
TobyMac

New Artist of the Year
Crystal Aikin
Bluetree
Jonny Diaz
Kari Jobe
Revive
Sidewalk Prophets
Brian Courtney Wilson

Group of the Year
Casting Crowns
Gaither Vocal Band
Hezekiah Walker & The Love Fellowship Crusade Choir
Jars of Clay
Needtobreathe
Skillet
Tenth Avenue North

Male Vocalist of the Year
Jeremy Camp
Jason Crabb
Michael English
Brandon Heath
Donnie McClurkin
Smokie Norful
Bebo Norman
Mark Schultz

Female Vocalist of the Year
Francesca Battistelli
Karen Peck Gooch
Natalie Grant
Heather Headley
Mandisa
Dawn Michele
Laura Story

Song of the Year
"Born to Climb" – Jeff & Sheri Easter
Wayne Haun, Joel Lindsey, songwriters
"By Your Side" – Tenth Avenue North
Tenth Avenue North, songwriters
"Free To Be Me" – Francesca Battistelli
Francesca Battistelli, songwriter
"God Is There" – Diamond Rio
Marty Roe, Jimmy Olander, Bernie Herms, songwriters
"I Will Rise" – Chris Tomlin
Louie Giglio, Chris Tomlin, Matt Maher, Jesse Reeves, songwriters
"Let The Waters Rise" – Mikeschair
Sam Tinnesz, Mike Grayson, Ben Glover, songwriters
"Revelation Song" – Phillips, Craig & Dean
Jennie Lee Riddle, songwriter
"Somebody Like Me" – Jason Crabb
Neil Thrasher, Michael Boggs, songwriters
"Two Hands" – Jars of Clay
Dan Haseltine, Charlie Lowell, Stephen Mason, Matt Odmark, Jeremy Lutito, Gabe Rushchival, songwriters
"Why Can't All God's Children Get Along" – Karen Peck and New River
Stephen Hill, songwriter

Songwriter of the Year
Francesca Battistelli
Michael Boggs
Mike Donehey
Jason Ingram
Jennie Lee Riddle
Neil Thrasher

Producer of the Year
Ed Cash
Ian Eskelin
Wayne Haun
Bernie Herms
Jason Ingram and Rusty Varenkamp

Pop
Pop/Contemporary Recorded Song of the Year
"City on Our Knees" – tobyMac
"Free to Be Me" – Francesca Battistelli
"Let the Waters Rise" – Mikeschair
"My Deliverer" – Mandisa
"Until the Whole World Hears" – Casting Crowns

Pop/Contemporary Album of the Year
Come Alive – Mark Schultz
Mikeschair – Mikeschair
Speaking Louder Than Before – Jeremy Camp
The Long Fall Back to Earth – Jars of ClayThese Simple Truths – Sidewalk Prophets

Rock
Rock Recorded Song of the Year
"Bring Me to Life" – Thousand Foot Krutch
"Fight Inside" – Red
"Hero" – Skillet"Mess of Me" – Switchfoot"Mystery of You" – Red

Rock/Contemporary Recorded Song of the Year
"Always" – Switchfoot
"Can't Take Away" – Mikeschair
"How He Loves" – David Crowder Band"Lay 'Em Down" – Needtobreathe"You Gave Me a Promise" – Fireflight

Rock Album of the Year
Awake – Skillet
Constellations – August Burns Red
Crash – Decyfer DownInnocence & Instinct – RedSearchlights – Abandon
Welcome to the Masquerade – Thousand Foot Krutch

Rock/Contemporary Album of the Year
Church Music – David Crowder Band
Confessions – Pillar
It Is Well – Kutless
Love & War – BarlowGirlThe Outsiders – NeedtobreatheRap/Hip-Hop
Rap/Hip-Hop Recorded Song of the Year
"America" – Tracy Edmond
"End of My Rope" – KJ-52
"Go On" – B.Reith
"Lost" – Da' T.R.U.T.H."Movin'" – Group 1 CrewRap/Hip-Hop Album of the YearFive-Two Television – KJ-52Now Is Not Forever – B.Reith
Reiterate – GRITS
The Big Picture – Da' T.R.U.T.H.
Thrilla – Mr. Del

Inspirational
Inspirational Recorded Song of the Year
"Hold On To Jesus" – Austins Bridge
"Hosanna" – Selah
"Jesus Saves" – Travis Cottrell
"Since The World Began" – Matt Maher, Amy Grant, Ed Cash, Mac Powell"The Only Hope" – Bebo NormanInspirational Album of the Year
A Grand New Day – Women of Faith Worship TeamFearless – Phillips, Craig & DeanJesus Saves Live – Travis Cottrell
Live at Oak Tree – Aaron & Amanda Crabb
You Deliver Me – Selah

Gospel
Southern Gospel Recorded Song of the Year
"Because He Lives" – Gaither Vocal Band"Born to Climb" – Jeff & Sheri Easter"If You Knew Him" – The Perrys
"Life Goes On" – Talley Trio
"Live With Jesus" – Oak Ridge Boys

Southern Gospel Album of the Year
Almost Morning – The PerrysReunited – Gaither Vocal BandNorth America Live – The Hoppers
Treasure – Janet Paschal
Worth It – Brian Free & Assurance

Traditional Gospel Recorded Song of the Year
"Always Remember" – Andrae Crouch
"Don't Do It Without Me" – Bishop Paul S. Morton
"How I Got Over" – Vickie Winans"Justified" – Smokie Norful"Oh Happy Day" – Queen Latifah

Traditional Gospel Album of the Year
Almost Morning – Dorothy Norwood
Gaither Vocal Band Reunited – Lee Williams and the Spiritual QC'sShout! Live – Mike Farris & The Roseland Rhythm RevueTreasure – Clarence Fountain, Sam Butler and The Boys

Contemporary Gospel Recorded Song of the Year
"Awesome God" – Fred Hammond
"Dear God" – Smokie Norful
"Every Prayer" – Israel Houghton
"So Good" – Melinda Watts
"Souled Out" – Hezekiah Walker & LFC"The Power of One (Change the World)" – Israel Houghton"Wait On The Lord" – Donnie McClurkin

Contemporary Gospel Album of the Year
America – Tracy Edmond
Audience of One – Heather HeadleyLove Unstoppable – Fred HammondSmokie Norful Live – Smokie Norful
Souled Out – Hezekiah Walker & LFC

Country & Bluegrass
Country Recorded Song of the Year
"Dry Bones" – Austins Bridge
"God Is There" – Diamond Rio
"King of the World" – Point of Grace"Somebody Like Me" – Jason Crabb"Thank God for Kids" – Ernie Haase and Signature Sound

Country Album of the Year
Jason Crabb – Jason Crabb
Live at Oak Tree – Austins Bridge
Never Going Back – Collin RayeThe Reason – Diamond RioThen Sings My Soul – Ronnie Milsap

Bluegrass Recorded Song of the Year
"I Heard My Savior Calling Me" – Rhonda Vincent
"On The Other Side" – Dailey & Vincent
"This World Is Not My Home" – Ricky Skaggs"When We Fly" – Little Roy Lewis & Lizzy Long"Working on a Building" – Patty Loveless

Bluegrass Album of the Year 
Blue Ridge Mtn. Memories – The Marksmen Quartet
Breaking Like Dawn – Little Roy Lewis & Lizzy Long
I Have Been Blessed – The Far City Boys
I Just Want To Thank You Lord – Larry Sparks
Lord Bless This House – Nothin FancyThe Isaacs ...Naturally – The IsaacsPraise & Worship
Worship Song of the Year
“Alive Again” – Matt Maher
Matt Maher and Jason Ingram, songwriters
“Hosanna” – Selah
Paul Baloche and Brenton Brown, songwriters
“I Will Rise” – Chris Tomlin
Chris Tomlin, songwriter
“New Song We Sing”; Meredith Andrews
Meredith Andrews, Jason Ingram, and Keith Everette Smith, songwriters“Revelation Song” – Phillips, Craig & DeanJennie Lee Riddle, songwriterPraise & Worship Album of the Year
A Grand New Day – Women of Faith Worship Team
Alive Again – Matt Maher
Awaken The Dawn – Keith & Kristyn GettyChurch Music – David Crowder BandJesus Saves Live – Travis Cottrell

Others
Urban Recorded Song of the Year
"Avaylable" – Kortney Pollard"Close To You" – BeBe & CeCe Winans"Just Love" – Brian Courtney Wilson
"Just Wanna Say" – Israel Houghton
"You Never Let Me Down" – Marvin Winans Jr.

Instrumental Album of the Year
A Moment's Peace, Vol. 2 – Christopher Phillips and John Catchings
A Moment's Peace, Vol. 1 – Christopher Phillips and John CatchingsJoy Comes In The Morning – Stan WhitmireMercy Mercy Mercy – Ben Tankard

Spanish Language Album of the Year
Adorándote – Julissa
Apasionado Por Ti – Rojo
Cerca de Mí – Yamil LedesmaLe Canto – Kari JobeSu Vida, Sus Pasos, Su Voz – Melodie Joy

Special Event Album of the Year
CompassionArt: Creating Freedom From Poverty (Sparrow Records)
Fireproof: Original Motion Picture Soundtrack (Reunion Records)Glory Revealed II: The Word of God In Worship (Reunion Records)Hip Hope Hits 2009 (Gotee Records)
Oh Happy Day: An All-Star Music Celebration (EMI Gospel/Vector Recordings)

Children's Music Album of the Year
Great Worship Songs for Kids 3 – GWS Kids Praise Band
I Shine Jamz, Vol. 1 – Todd Collins
Shout Praises Kids: Today Is The Day – Various
The Real Thing – pureNRGVeggie Tales: Here I Am To Worship – Featuring Natalie Grant & Aaron ShustChristmas Album of the YearChrist Is Come – Big Daddy WeaveChristmas Is – Mark Harris
Every Light That Shines at Christmas – Ernie Haase & Signature Sound
Glory in the Highest: Christmas Songs of Worship – Chris Tomlin
Family Force 5 Christmas Pageant – Family Force 5

Choral Collection of the Year
Everlasting Praise 2 – Mike Speck and Stan Whitmire
Hallelujah! Light Has Come – Various arrangers
Hymns of the Ages – Lari Goss
Let The Worshippers Arise – Various arrangersJesus Saves Live – Travis CottrellRecorded Music Packaging of the Year
Live Life Loud – Hawk Nelson
Bonnie Biro (art director), Ryan Clark (graphic artist), Caleb Kuhl (illustrator/photographer); BEC Recordings
Lost in the Sound of Separation (Deluxe Edition) – Underoath
Jordan Butcher (art director), Drew Beckmeyer (graphic artist), Ryan Russell (illustrator/photographer); Tooth & Nail Records/Solid State Records
It's All Crazy! It's All False! It's All a Dream! It's Alright – MewithoutYou
Jordan Butcher (art director/graphic artist), Vasily Kavonof (illustrator/photographer); Tooth & Nail RecordsThe Long Fall Back to Earth (Limited Edition) – Jars of ClayTim Parker and Jars of Clay (art directors), Kharyn Hill; Gray Matters/Essential RecordsForget and Not Slow Down – Relient K
Matthew Thiessen and Linden Frederick (art directors), Davy Baysinger, Ethan Luck, Cale Glendening; Mono Vs Stereo
The Long Fall Back to Earth – Jars of Clay
Tim Parker and Jars of Clay (art directors), Kharyn Hill; Gray Matters/Essential Records

Musicals
Musical of the YearA Baby Changes Everything
Glorious Impossible
It's The Most Wonderful Time of the Year
Reign, Jesus, Reign
See What A Morning

Youth/Children's Musical
Camp Wallaballa
Christmas Hang-ups
Get To The Manger!
GPS (God's Plan of Salvation)
The Best Christmas Present Ever!

Videos
Short Form Music Video of the Year
"Beautiful Ending" – BarlowGirl
Tim Morgan (video director and producer)
"Free to Be Me" – Francesca Battistelli
Andy & Jon Erwin (video directors), Dan Atchison (video producer)
"Hero" – Skillet
Andy & Jon Erwin (video directors), Dan Atchison (video producer)
"Live Life Loud" – Hawk Nelson
Etypical (video director), Kayvan Ghavim (video producer)
"Lose My Soul" – TobyMac, featuring Kirk Franklin and Mandisa
Danny Yourd (video director), Danny Yourd and Steve Hoover (video producers)
"Monster" – Skillet
Andy & Jon Erwin (video directors), Dan Atchison (video producer)
"Too Bright To See" – Underoath
Anders Foreman (video director and producer)
"Wait and See" – Brandon Heath
Eric Welch (video director), Tameron Hedge (video producer)

Long Form Music Video of the Year
45 Days (Documentary w/music) – Demon Hunter
Cale Glendening (video director), Don and Ryan Clark (video producers)
A Gospel Journey – Oak Ridge Boys
Doug Stuckey (video director), Bill Gaither, Barry Jennings, and Bill Carter (video producers)
A New Hallelujah: The Live Worship DVD – Michael W. Smith
Steve Gilreath (video director and producer)
Faith + Hope + Love – Hillsong Live
Luke Irvine and Magdalene Phillips (video directors), Hillsong Music (video producers)
Live at Oak Tree – Austins Bridge
Graham Bustin (video director), Paul Corley, Tre Corley, Norman Holland, Michael Turner, and Shannon Lancaster (video producers)
Live Revelations – Third Day
Andy and Jon Erwin (video directors), Dan Atchison, Jonathan Erwin, and Andrew Erwin (video producers)

Artists with multiple nominations and awards 

The following artists received multiple nominations:
 Six: Jars of Clay, Skillet, Matt Maher and Jason Crabb
 Five: Francesca Battistelli
 Four: Smokie Norful
 Three: Casting Crowns, Gaither Vocal Band, Needtobreathe
 Two: Tenth Avenue North, Jeremy Camp

The following artists received multiple awards:
 Three: Needtobreathe
 Two: Jennie Lee Riddle, Francesca Battistelli, Jars of Clay

References
, official winners list by year

External links
Dove Awards Hosts and Nominees at DoveAwards.com
Dove Awards winners at DoveAwards.com
List of Nominees

GMA Music Awards
GMA Dove Awards
GMA Dove
2010 in American music
GMA